Live Your Life Be Free is the fourth studio album by American singer Belinda Carlisle, released in 1991 by MCA Records in the United States and Virgin Records in the UK. This was the first of Carlisle's albums not to chart in the United States and the last album of hers to produce a U.S. Billboard Hot 100 single ("Do You Feel Like I Feel?", number 73).  The album fared better in the UK, where it peaked at number seven.

Carlisle co-wrote two of the tracks on the album: "Loneliness Game" and "Little Black Book" (which went to number 28 in  the UK Singles Chart).

The song "You Came Out of Nowhere" begins with a sample from the opening of "Nobody Told Me", a song by John Lennon that was released in 1984.

Reception and chart performance

The reception of Live Your Life Be Free was not as good as her previous albums. Rolling Stone wrote "Carlisle merely stirs up a nostalgia for carefree girl groups singing gooey love songs – giving Live Your Life a certain giddy, pointless coherence", while for AllMusic, "Live Your Life Be Free shows the singer to be capable in a variety of musical contexts, and is a pleasing listen throughout".

The album sold better outside the U.S. and managed to enter the top 10 in the UK, where it was certified gold. Outside the UK the album charted No. 21 in Sweden for 10 weeks and No. 27 in Australia.

The first single release outside the United States was the album title track, which peaked at No. 11 in Italy, No. 12 in the UK, No. 16 in Sweden and No. 13 in Australia. In the U.S. the first single to be released was "Do You Feel Like I Feel?", which was the last Carlisle single to enter the U.S. top 100.

Live Your Life Be Free was re-released on August 26, 2013, in a 2CD+DVD casebook edition from Edsel Recording, featuring the original album remastered, the single versions, remixes and B-sides. The DVD features the videos from the album and an exclusive interview with Carlisle discussing the album.

Track listing

2013 Remastered Deluxe version

Personnel 
 Belinda Carlisle – lead vocals
 Charles Judge – keyboards (1, 2, 4–9), drum programming (2, 5, 7, 9)
 Rick Nowels – arrangements (1, 2, 4–7, 9), keyboards (1, 2, 7), 12-string acoustic guitar (1), backing vocals (4, 6, 9), surf guitars (7), acoustic guitar (8), 6-string guitar (8), 12-string guitar (8)
 Kevin Savigar – keyboards (3, 8)
 David Munday – arrangements (4, 6), keyboards (4, 6), drum programming (4, 6), backing vocals (4, 6, 9)
 Kim Bullard – keyboards (10, 11)
 Michael Landau – guitar (1–3, 5–8, 10, 11), sitar solo (2)
 Ben Schultz – guitar (1, 4), drum programming (1)
 Rusty Anderson – guitar (3, 8)
 Eric Bazilian – mandolin (3)
 Paul Jackson Jr. – guitar (4)
 Dave Alvin – guitar (8)
 Jon Ingoldsby – additional guitar (10)
 T.J. Parker – guitar solo (11)
 John Pierce – bass (1, 7)
 Eric Pressly – bass (3, 8, 10, 11)
 Denny Fongheiser – drums (3, 10, 11), drum samples (10)
 Stan Lynch – drums (3), percussion (8)
 Kenny Aronoff – percussion (3), drums (8)
 Luis Conte – percussion (4)
 Michael Kamen – oboe (3)
 Patrick Seymour – orchestration (3), string arrangements (8)
 Sachi McHenry – cello (8)
 Charlie Bisharat – violin (8)
 Juliann French – violin (8)
 Valerie Pinkston – backing vocals (1, 2, 5–7, 9)
 Ellen Shipley – backing vocals (1, 2, 4, 5, 7, 10)
 Maria Vidal – backing vocals (1, 2, 4–7, 9, 10)
 Gia Ciambotti – backing vocals (3, 8)
 Sheryl Crow – backing vocals (3, 8, 10)
 Debra Parson – backing vocals (3, 8, 11)
 Edie Lehmann – backing vocals (4)
 Diana Graselli – backing vocals (5, 6, 9)
 Tom Kelly – backing vocals (6)
 Nadirah Ali – backing vocals (8)
 Marcy Levy – backing vocals (8)
 Naomi Star – backing vocals (8, 11)

Production 
 Producers – Rick Nowels (Tracks 1, 2, 4–7, 9, 10 & 11); Richard Feldman (Tracks 3 & 8); David Munday (Tracks 4 & 6); Eric Pressly (Tracks 10 & 11).
 Engineers – John Kovarek (Tracks 1, 2, 4, 5, 7 & 9); Greg Droman and Ross Hogarth (Tracks 3 & 8); Jon Ingoldsby (Tracks 3, 8, 10 & 11); Peter Arata (Tracks 4 & 6); Jim Reinhardt (Track 10); Steve Rinkoff (Track 11).
 Additional Engineer on Track 5 – Peter Arata 
 Mixing – Steve MacMillan (Tracks 1 & 2); Mick Guzauski (Tracks 2 & 4); Peter Arata (Tracks 3, 5, 8, 10 & 11); Ken Kessie (Track 6); Mark DeSisto (Track 9).
Mix Assistant - Danny Alonso
 Mixed at Cherokee Studios and Larrabee Sound Studios (Hollywood, CA); Lighthouse Studios (Los Angeles, CA); Can-Am Recorders (Tarzana, CA).
 Mastered by Stephen Marcussen at Precision Lacquer (Hollywood, CA).
 Art Direction – Nick Egan 
 Design – Nick Egan and Eric Roinestad
 Illustration – Kathryn Otoshi
 Photography – Grant Matthews
 Still Life Photo – Michele Laurita
 Management – Larry Goldberg and Ron Stone 
 Hair – Katarina Erhardt
 Make-up – Paul Starr
 Stylist – Jeannine Braden

Charts

Weekly charts

Year-end charts

Certifications

References

1991 albums
Belinda Carlisle albums
Albums produced by Rick Nowels
MCA Records albums
Virgin Records albums